Tyndale Biscoe School is a school in the Sheikh Bagh neighbourhood, in the Lal Chowk area of  Srinagar, Jammu and Kashmir, India. The school was founded in 1880 CE and is one of the oldest schools in Jammu and Kashmir, the oldest being S.P school which was founded in 1874 CE. The school was started by Christian missionaries and was named after Canon Cecil Tyndale-Biscoe (1863–1949).  It still has affiliations with the Church Mission Society. The first principal was Reverend J.H.Knowles. Mabel Yonzon is the principal while Parvez Samuel Kaul, a former Principal, is now the director of the institution.

Departments
The school has five departments. The activities of the departments are looked over by well experienced Heads Of Departments.

Activities
Tyndale Biscoe School is known for its extra-curricular activities, especially swimming, skiing, mountain climbing, camping and regatta. School placed emphasis on physical activities including mountaineering, tug-of-war, trekking, boxing, boating, football, cricket, and swimming stimulating sense of courage, masculinity and physical fitness.

When football was introduced in the Valley by Missionary School, there was resistance initially. Students felt the cow leather was holy and touching the ball, made out of it, was blasphemous. Instead they played football with a wooden clog (known as Khraav in Kashmiri) in their feet. Similarly, when boating was introduced in Mission School students did not like boating because, in Kashmiri society, boatmen weren't consider respectable members of the society. But later it was adopted and the Mission School boys became efficient paddlers and rowers.

History
Rev. J.H. Knowles, in 1880, laid the foundation of the C.M.S. (Church Mission Society) School on the hospital premises (Modern Chest Disease Hospital, Drugjan) in Srinagar. The school was started with 5 pupils. In 1883, the number of boys in the school increased to 30.

In 1890, the Government permitted the C.M.S. to shift the school to downtown, and it was moved from the hospital premises (Drugjan) to a large house and compound on the river bank in the middle of the city at Fateh Kadal. As a result of this, the number of students increased to about 200 in 1890.
Canon C.E. Tyndale-Biscoe joined the school in 1891, there were 250 pupils on the school roll. The primary school grew into a middle school and eventually into a high school. The high school was designated the Hadow Memorial School after the name of its honorary treasurer for 40 years. Eventually, five other mission schools were set up, one each in different parts of the capital city and one in Anantnag.

Notable alumni
 Imran Raza Ansari – (born 1972) Politician and Religious Scholar
 Farooq Abdullah – (born 1937) politician and former Chief Minister of Jammu and Kashmir.
 Agha Shaukat Ali – (1920–2013) Kashmiri Civil Servant turned Pakistani Politician after partition.
 Masarat Alam Bhat – (born 1971) Kashmiri separatist leader chairman of the Jammu Kashmir Muslim League and also serving as chairman of the Hurriyat Conference.
 Thupstan Chhewang (born 1947) is an Indian politician
 Durga Prasad Dhar – (1918–1975) prominent Kashmiri politician and an Indian diplomat.
 P. N. Dhar (1919–2012) was an economist and the head of Indira Gandhi's secretariat.
 Khurshid Drabu CBE (1946–2018) was an English judge, law lecturer and Muslim community leader. He was the first Muslim to be a judge in Britain.
 Shah Faesal – (born 1983) IAS civil servant, social activist, politician.
 Bakshi Ghulam Mohammad – (1907–1972) politician and former Prime Minister of Jammu and Kashmir
 Mohammad Shafi Qureshi (1929–2016) an advocate, Indian politician and statesman from Kashmir and the founder of the Congress Party in Jammu and Kashmir.
 Ashfaq Majeed Wani – (1966–1990) first Commander-in-Chief of Jammu Kashmir Liberation Front.

Financial controversy 
Rajan Sandhu, former Estates Supervisor of Tyndale-Biscoe and Mallinson society, along with member of St.Paul's Church, Amritsar, Isaac Samuel, approached the Chief Judicial Magistrate (CJM) Srinagar to claim that chairman of joint management committee, Bishop of diocese of Amritsar, Pradeep Kumar Samantaroy, Principal and Director, Tyndale Biscoe and Mallinson School, Parvez Samuel Koul, Headmistress of Mallinson School and The Kashmir Valley school, Joyce Kaul, Administrator Tyndale Biscoe and Mallinson school, Rahul rex Kaul,  Chief Accounts officer of Tyndale Biscoe and Mallinson School, and Accounts and estates officer, Vijendara Dhanvantri were in league with each other in resorting to illegal and corrupt practices which was bringing harm to the school and that they “withdrew unaudited crores of rupees by way of labeling the sums as basic salary, cost of living, honorarium, travel allowance, medical expenses overtime etc”.
Further, they claimed that the assets of the society have been converted into personal assets.“The illegal conversion of society assets into personal assets needs a thorough investigation. As in case of Tyndale Biscoe and Mallinson school Tangmarg, spread across an area of 19 Kanals of land, 12 kanals have been purchased in the name of Parvez Koul and seven Kanals in the name of Joyce Kaul, using the money of the society as reflected in the book accounts,” the litigation states.

References

External links
 Tyndale Biscoe School on TBMES parent website

Boys' schools in India
Schools in Srinagar
Schools in Jammu and Kashmir
Schools in India
Educational institutions established in 1880
1880 establishments in British India
Schools founded by missionaries